This is the discography for American hip hop musician Fashawn.

Albums

Studio albums
 Boy Meets World (2009)
 The Ecology (2015)

Collaborative albums
 This Generation (with Murs) (2012)
 All Hail the King (with Sir Veterano) (2021)

EPs
 FASH-ionably Late (with The Alchemist) (2014)
 Manna (2017)

MixtapesGrizzly City Vol. 1 (2006)The Phenom Vol. 1 (2007)Grizzly City Vol. 2 (2007)The Phenom Vol. 2 (2008)One Shot One Kill (presented by Mick Boogie and Terry Urban) (2008) Higher Learning Vol. 1 (2008)The Antidote (2009)Ode To Illmatic (presented by DJ Green Lantern) (2010) Grizzly City Vol. 3 (presented by DJ Skee) (2010) 
 Higher Learning Vol. 2 (2011)Champagne & Styrofoam Cups'' (2012)

Guest appearances

Music videos

As main artist

As featured artist

References

Discographies of American artists
Hip hop discographies